Millhaven may refer to:

Millhaven Institution, a Canadian prison
Millhaven, Ontario, a community in Canada
Millhaven Creek, Ontario, Canada
Millhaven, Georgia, a community in the United States